P66, or Papyrus 66, is a biblical manuscript of the Gospel of John.

P66 may also refer to:

BMW P66, an automobile engine
, a submarine
Jensen P66, a sports car
Percival P.66 Pembroke, a transport aircraft
Vultee P-66 Vanguard, a fighter aircraft
P66, a state regional road in Latvia